Pseudolachnostylis is a genus of plants in the family Phyllanthaceae first described as a genus in 1899. It contains only one known species, Pseudolachnostylis maprouneifolia native to central and southern Africa. Its common name is kudu berry, though the term also applies for Cassine aethiopica. In Zimbabwe it is called mutsonzowa (Shona) or Umqobampunzi (Ndebele).

varieties
four varieties are recognized
 Pseudolachnostylis maprouneifolia var. dekindtii (Pax) Radcl.-Sm. - Katanga, Tanzania, Angola, Malawi, Mozambique, Zambia, Zimbabwe, Botswana, Namibia, Limpopo, Mpumalanga
 Pseudolachnostylis maprouneifolia var. glabra (Pax) Brenan - Burundi, Zaire, Tanzania, Angola, Malawi, Mozambique, Zambia, Zimbabwe, Botswana, Namibia, Limpopo, Mpumalanga
 Pseudolachnostylis maprouneifolia var. maprouneifolia - Katanga, Burundi, Tanzania, Angola, Malawi, Mozambique, Zambia, Zimbabwe, Botswana, Caprivi Strip
 Pseudolachnostylis maprouneifolia var. polygyna (Pax & K.Hoffm.) Radcl.-Sm. - Tanzania, Zambia, Malawi

References 

Phyllanthaceae
Phyllanthaceae genera
Monotypic Malpighiales genera
Flora of Africa